Ukraine competed at the 2009 Summer Universiade in Belgrade, Serbia, from 1 to 12 July 2009. 162 athletes formed the Ukrainian team. They competed in archery, athletics, basketball, diving, fencing, football, gymnastics, judo, swimming, table tennis, taekwondo, tennis, and volleyball. The only sport Ukraine did not participate in was water polo. Ukraine won 31 medals, including 7 gold medals, and ranked 6th.

Medal summary

Medal by sports

Medalists

See also
 Ukraine at the 2009 Winter Universiade

References

Nations at the 2009 Summer Universiade
2009 in Ukrainian sport
2009